St. Olaf's Church is a Catholic church in the Harju district of Jyväskylä, in Finland.

After World War II, the Catholic parishes of Karelia and Vyborg Terijoki were merged, with services held in Lahti. A more central location was sought, however, and so the community moved to a chapel in Jyväskylä on January 10, 1949. Outgrowing this space, a new church was commissioned in 1962. Designed by Olavi Kivimaa, it is an austere concrete structure with a covered facade.

The parish serves most Catholics in central and eastern Finland. In addition to the church, it sponsors a parish center, a Catholic school, a student residence, a rectory and apartments.

See also
Roman Catholicism in Finland
St. Henry's Cathedral

References

External links

Buildings and structures in Jyväskylä
Roman Catholic churches completed in 1962
Christian organizations established in 1949
20th-century Roman Catholic church buildings in Finland
Jyväskylä